The 2001–02 season was the 95th season in the existence of RC Lens and the club's 13th consecutive season in the top flight of French football. In addition to the domestic league, Lens participated in this season's editions of the Coupe de France and the Coupe de la Ligue. The season covered the period from 1 July 2001 to 30 June 2002.

First-team squad
Squad at end of season

Pre-season and friendlies

Competitions

Overview

French Division 1

League table

Results summary

Results by round

Matches

Source:

Coupe de France

Coupe de la Ligue

References

External links

RC Lens seasons
Lens